Gervase of Melkley or Gervase of Melkeley (born c. 1185, fl. 1200–1219) was a Norman scholar and poet.

Biography
Gervais was born in England c. 1185.

Around 1200, he studied in France, probably in Rouen, under poet John of Hauville.

He spent his adult life in England, where he is last attested in 1219.

English chronicler Matthew Paris mentions him as an astrologer and an authority for the life of Stephen Langton, Archbishop of Canterbury. Paris also describes him as the author of the epitaph on William Marshal, 1st Earl of Pembroke, who died in 1219.

In his work, he refers to himself as Gervasius de Saltu Lacteo.

Ars versificaria
He wrote Ars versificaria (The Art of Versifying) c. 1208–1216 (possibly, in 1215–1216), using both classical and medieval sources. Targeted at young students of rhetoric, it includes a list of recommended reading and mainly discusses rhetorical and grammatical figures, with examples, and gives some notes on word formation. It is also known as Ars poetica and De arte versificatoria et modo dictandi.

The book consists of three parts. The first part discusses basic principles common to all types of discourse. The second part is devoted to composition, discussing proverbs, elegance of style, arguments, rules of verse and prose composition. The third part deals with letter-writing.

Among his sources are ancient authors Horace (Ars Poetica), Cicero (De Inventione), Aelius Donatus (Barbarismus) and Juvenal, as well as Bernard Silvestris's Cosmographia, Alain of Lille's Anticlaudianus, John of Hauville's Architrenius, and Geoffrey of Vinsauf's Poetria nova. He also quotes the Book of Psalms and some of his own short poems.

The book is dedicated to a certain Johannes Albus.

The manuscript is conserved in Balliol College, Oxford (MS. Balliol, 276).

Poems
As well as in Ars versificaria, his poems also survive in an early thirteenth-century collection of poetry known as Hunterian Anthology. Apart from works by Gervase, the anthology also includes works by Matthew of Vendôme, Geoffrey of Vinsauf, and some poems of unknown authorship.

His known poems, most of them elegiac couplets, include:
 "Parmenidis rupes", where he prays that he be granted understanding of Aristotelian complexities.
 "Magnus Alexander", in praise of John de Gray, Bishop of Norwich. Writing in 1200, he congratulates Norwich on the newly elected bishop and compares de Gray to John the Baptist and John the Apostle.
 A long poem about Ovidian lovers Pyramus and Thisbe, known only from an incomplete copy. It was probably written when Gervase was a schoolboy, as a rhetorical exercise.
 "In honorem matris Dei", to Virgin Mary, his only known rhythmical poem.

References

Further reading
 A thirteenth-century anthology of rhetorical poems: Glasgow ms. Hunterian V.8.14, ed. Bruce Harbert (Toronto, 1973).
 Gervais of Melkley's Treatise on the Art of Versifying and the Method of Composing in Prose: Translation and Commentary, Catherine Yodice Giles (PhD Diss., Rutgers University, 1973).
 Eros, Agape, and Rhetoric around 1200: Gervase of Melkley's Ars poetica and Gottfried von Strassburg's Tristan, Robert Glendinning (Speculum, Vol. 67, No. 4, pp. 892–925, 1992).
 Gervais von Melkley: Ars Poetica, ed. Hans-Jürgen Gräbener (Münster, 1965).
 The treatment of action in medieval poetics, 1175‐1280, John Gronbeck-Tedesco (Central States Speech Journal, Volume 35, Issue 2, 61–76, 1984).
 Identitas, Similitudo, and Contrarietas in Gervasius of Melkley's Ars poetica: A Stasis of Style, William M. Purcell (Rhetorica: A Journal of the History of Rhetoric, Vol. 9, No. 1, pp. 67–91, 1991).
 The Historical Works of Gervase of Canterbury, ed. William Stubbs (London, 1880) 2012 edition.

Grammarians of Latin
Rhetoric theorists
Medieval linguists
13th-century French poets
13th-century Latin writers
12th-century French people
13th-century French people
12th-century births
13th-century deaths
Medieval Latin poets
French male writers
French male poets